Stephen Aitken (born 25 September 1976 in Glasgow) is a Scottish football player and coach who was most recently manager of East Kilbride.

Aitken played for Greenock Morton, Stranraer, Stenhousemuir and Junior side Arthurlie. He rejoined Stranraer in 2009 as assistant manager to Keith Knox. Aitken retired as a player in 2011, and he has since managed Stranraer and Dumbarton.

His younger brother Chris is also a former footballer.

Playing career
Aitken started his senior career with Greenock Morton, where he played for eight years before moving to Stranraer where he stayed for six years. Upon leaving Stranraer he joined Stenhousemuir briefly, before leaving the senior game to join Barrhead side Arthurlie in the Junior ranks.

Coaching career
In 2009, he returned to Stranraer for a second time at the age of 32, and shortly thereafter took up a role as assistant manager. On 27 October 2012 Aitken was appointed manager at the club.

After a successful three years with Stranraer he joined Dumbarton in May 2015, to replace Ian Murray. He won his first competitive game in charge 3–2 against former club Greenock Morton. After keeping the club in the Scottish Championship for both of his seasons in charge, he agreed a new 2-year deal in May 2017.

Aitken led the Sons to the Scottish Challenge Cup Final the following season, but a difficult league campaign resulted in relegation to Scottish League One after defeat to Alloa Athletic in the Scottish Championship play-offs. After a slow start to the 2018–19 Scottish League One season left the club in ninth position, Aitken left Dumbarton in October 2018.

Aitken was appointed manager of Lowland League team East Kilbride in May 2020. After his first season was declared null and void due to the COVID-19 pandemic in Scotland, Aitken left Kilby a month into the 2021-22 campaign after the club's worst start to a season in their history.

Managerial statistics

 East Kilbride statistics include League Cup forfeit victory against Kilmarnock on 10 July 2021.

Honours and achievements

Player
Greenock Morton
Scottish Second Division: 1994–95

Stranraer
Scottish Third Division: 2003–04
Scottish Second Division promotion: 2004–05

References

External links
 

1976 births
Arthurlie F.C. players
Association football midfielders
Greenock Morton F.C. players
Living people
People educated at Park Mains High School
Scottish Football League managers
Scottish Football League players
Scottish football managers
Scottish footballers
Scottish Junior Football Association players
Scottish Professional Football League managers
Footballers from Glasgow
Stenhousemuir F.C. players
Stranraer F.C. managers
Stranraer F.C. players
Dumbarton F.C. managers
People from Erskine
Footballers from Renfrewshire
East Kilbride F.C. managers
Lowland Football League managers